Franklin James Thomas (August 2, 1943 – September 9, 2020), known professionally as Frank Thomas, was an American singer, songwriter and guitarist from Florida. A native Floridian, he was a 2013 inductee into the Florida Artists Hall of Fame.

References

External links

1943 births
2020 deaths
Singer-songwriters from Florida
People from Middleburg, Florida